Zygmunt Wrzodak (born 21 March 1959 in Budy Zaklasztorne) is a Polish politician. He was elected to the Sejm on 25 September 2005, getting 18,921 votes in 23 Rzeszów district as a candidate from the League of Polish Families list.

He was also a member of Sejm 2001-2005.

See also
Members of Polish Sejm 2005-2007

References

1959 births
Living people
People from Żyrardów County
Members of the Polish Sejm 2001–2005
Members of the Polish Sejm 2005–2007
League of Polish Families politicians
Movement for Reconstruction of Poland politicians